Turgut Uyar (August 4, 1927 – August 22, 1985) was a Turkish poet.

Life 
Turgut Uyar was born in Ankara on 4 August 1927 as the fifth of the six children of Fatma Hanım and Hayri Bey. His father served as a squadron leader in the army and his mother was a housewife. He studied primary school in different cities of Turkey. Then he went to military high school in Bursa. He married Yezdan Şener when he was going to university and he had three children, Semiramis, Tunga and Şeyda, from this marriage. He served as a personnel officer in Posof, Terme and Ankara. He resigned from office in 1958 and divorced his wife in 1966. After moving to Istanbul, he married Tomris Uyar in 1969. He died on 22 August 1985 from cirrhosis.

References

1927 births
1985 deaths
Turkish poets
Burials at Aşiyan Asri Cemetery